Reoti is a town and a nagar panchayat in Ballia district in the Indian state of Uttar Pradesh.

Demographics
 India census, Reoti had a population of 26,359 (13,577 male and 12,782 female) with 3,910 households. Reoti has an average literacy rate of 52.63%, lower than the national average of 59.5%: male literacy is 60.51%, and female literacy is 44.26%. In Reoti, 16.53% of the population is under 6 years of age,Ram leela Maidan, मौनिया बाबा हनुमान जी मन्दिर, महाकाल मंदिर, Reoti,Ward No 4,Pandey Mansion, सिद्धार्थ उपवन, Kali Mandir, Dah, Kol nala, Naga Baba Ka Pokhara and Mahadev Sthan is very eminent in Reoti city Attachment to the idea of computers can be gauged from the fact, the less educated person here keeps information about computers.

Temples

 Kali Temple (Bhatwaliya Road)
 Thakur G Temple Reoti (South Area)
 Mahadev Sthan Temple (near Dah)
 Budhwa Shiv Temple (North Side)
 महाकाल मंदिर (South Side)
 Hanuman Mandir (South Side Near Dah)
 Durga Mata mandir uttar tola
 मौनिया बाबा हनुमान जी मंदिर
 प्राचीन शिवजी मंदिर
 सँतोषी माता मंदिर
 Hanuman Gadhi (Bus Stand)..
 माँ काली मंदिर (South Side)
 महादेव स्थान ( South Side )
 Shiv G Temple (Pokhara)

Schools & Colleges
 Manasthali Education Center
 Shemushi Vidyapeeth
 Reoti Inter College
 Sai Public School
 RNP Public School
 Gopal ji Memorial School
 Raja shishu Shiksha Niketan
 Ved Mata Gayatri Siksha Peeth
 govt.junior high school
 govt girls junior high school
 govt primary school No-1
 govt primary school No-2
 govt primary school No-3
 govt primary school No-4
 govt girls primary school
 गोपाल जी स्नातकोत्तर महाविद्यालय
 GOPAL Ji B.Ed. & D.El.Ed. College

References

 

Cities and towns in Ballia district